Bull Sluice Lake is a small reservoir located along the Chattahoochee River in northern Georgia, in the northern suburbs of metro Atlanta. Besides the hydroelectric power produced by the dam, the lake's primary use is recreation, including fishing and rowing.

The term "Bull Sluice", so named by Cherokee people, originally was a shoal on the Chattahoochee River.

References

External links
Georgia DNR's Bull Sluice Lake Page

ACF River Basin
Protected areas of Cobb County, Georgia
History of Atlanta
Reservoirs in Georgia (U.S. state)
Roswell, Georgia
Protected areas of Fulton County, Georgia
Bodies of water of Fulton County, Georgia